Tony Dias is a Bangladeshi television actor and director.

Career
In 1989, Dias joined the theatre group "Nagorik Natya Sampradaya".

Personal life
Dias is married to Dancer, Actress, Model Priya Dias. Together, with their daughter Ahona, they permanently reside in Hicksville in Long Island, New York. Dias works as a sales manager in auto sales.

References

Living people
Bangladeshi male television actors
Year of birth missing (living people)